Chloé Boreham is a Franco-Australian actress (born 31 August 1986). She is best known for the leading role as detective Bridget Anderson on the Channel 7 television drama The Killing Field.

Biography
Early life and education

Boreham was born in Sydney, her mother is French born in Paris and her father is British born in North East London. Growing up, she attended the French school of Sydney. She completed a bachelor's degree of theatre studies at Melbourne University, before attending Melbourne's screen acting school 16th Street Actor's Studio taught by award-winning actors/directors such as Kerry Armstrong, Nadia Tass and Kim Farrant. Boreham also trained in Paris at the Theatre de Soleil.

Performance career
Boreham has played leading roles in film, theatre and television in both English and French speaking roles. She played the leading role of Isabelle in "Between Me" directed by the award-winning director Kim Farrant, a half hour drama that was developed over eight months which premiered at the St. Kilda Film Festival. Boreham played a leading role in the short film Gorilla  directed by Tim Marshall which premiered at the Palm Springs International ShortFest and was awarded the prestigious 2013 U.K Iris Prize Award. Boreham also starred in the sequel to the horror/thriller film Wolf Creek 2 directed by Greg McLean which premiered at the 2013 Venice Film Festival and the 2013 Paris International Fantastic Film Festival. In 2014, she played a leading role in the Channel 7 Telemovie The Killing Field alongside Rebecca Gibney, Peter O'Brien and Liam McIntyre, directed by Palme d'Or Nominated Australian/British Director Samantha Lang.

Boreham played a semi-regular role on the 2015 AACTA-award-winning ABC show series 'Ready For This' directed by Tony Krawitz and Daina Reid. In 2016, Boreham starred in the film 'Messiah' with its world premiere at the 2016 Sydney Film Festival, alongside David Gulpilil and Stephen Hunter, directed by Damian Walshe-Howling and produced by the Weinstein Company.

Her Australian stage credits include Patricia Cornelius' Slut, Martin Crimp's Attempts on Her Life and Sergi Belbel's Blood. Boreham has also appeared in a number of guest roles in Australian Television

Filmography

Film and TV

Theatre

References

External links
 

1986 births
Living people
Australian television actresses
Actresses from Sydney